Jegi-dong Station is a station on Line 1 on the Seoul Subway network.

This station is very close to the site of the former Seongdong Station, the original western terminus of the Gyeongchun Line from 1939 to 1971. Only a moments walk from the station is Gyeongdong Market, a large, well known medicinal market, and the Seoul Yangnyeongsi Herb Medicine Museum, a free museum dedicated to educating visitors about traditional Korean medicine.

Station layout

References

Metro stations in Dongdaemun District
Seoul Metropolitan Subway stations
Railway stations opened in 1974